Leytenant Shestakov was a destroyer of the Imperial Russian Navy and the name ship of her class. The ship was built by the Naval Yard, Nikolayev from 1906 to 1909, being launched on 28 July 1908. The ship served in the Russian Black Sea Fleet during the First World War, passing to control of the Bolsheviks following the October Revolution but was scuttled on 18 June 1918 to avoid capture by German troops.

Design and construction
The  was developed to meet a requirement for larger destroyers for the Black Sea Fleet based on experience of the Russo-Japanese War. Two funnels were fitted.

The ship was originally designed to have a gun armament of six 75 mm guns, but was completed with one of the guns replaced by a single 120 mm (4.7 in gun). Three 450 mm (17.7 in) torpedo tubes were fitted, while 40 mines could be carried. After 1909, another 75 mm gun was replaced by a 120 mm gun, while after 1914, the remaining 75 mm guns were replaced by two 47 mm anti-aircraft guns and the mine load increased to 50. The ship had a crew of 94.

Leytenant Shestakov  was laid down at the Naval Yard, Nikolayev (now Mykolaiv), Ukraine on 16 September 1906 New Style (NS) (3 September 1906 Old Style (OS)), was launched on 28 July 1907, and entered service with the Black Sea Fleet on 1 October 1909 (NS) (18 September 1909 OS).

Service
Leytenant Shestakov remained part of the Black Sea fleet during the First World War, although the low speed of the Leytenant Shestakovs limited their usefulness.  Operations included raids against  Turkish communications and bombardment of the Turkish coast, and blockade operations off Turkey and Romania.

Early on 8 January 1916, Leytenant Shestakov and the destroyer  sank the  collier , on passage to Zonguldak to load coal, off Kirpen island. Later that day, the Turkish battlecruiser Yavûz Sultân Selîm, which had been tasked to cover Carmen as the collier arrived at Zonguldak, spotted the two destroyers and set off in pursuit. The Russian destroyers signalled the presence of Yavûz by radio, and the  intercepted Yavûz, resulting in the action of 8 January 1916, in which the two capital ships briefly exchanged fire. From September 1916, Leytenant Shestakov was deployed in support of the left flank of the Russian-Romanian armies during the Romanian Campaign.

In December 1918, following the October Revolution, Leytenant Shestakov came under control of the Bolshevik Black Sea Fleet. While an Armistice between Russia and the Central Powers was signed on 15 December 1917, hostilities restarted in February 1918, with the Germans advancing deep into Ukraine. The Black Sea Fleet, including Leytenant Shestakov, evacuated from Sevastopol on 14–15 May 1918, just before the Germans took the city, moving to Novorossiysk. On 18 May, with the Germans threatening to continue their attack if the Black Sea Fleet did not return to Sevastapol and be surrendered to German control, Leytenant Shestakov, along with much of the Black Sea Fleet, was scuttled in accordance with orders from Moscow.

The ship was raised on 10 December 1927 and was subsequently scrapped.

Notes

References

Bibliography
 
 
 

 

Leytenant Shestakov-class destroyers
Ships of the Imperial Russian Navy
1907 ships